The Diocese of Gibraltar is a jurisdiction within both the Anglican and Roman Catholic Church.

 Diocese of Gibraltar in Europe (Anglican)
 Diocese of Gibraltar (Roman Catholic)